The 2008-09 season is the first season of the Balkan International Basketball League. Ten teams from the Republic of Macedonia, Bulgaria, Romania and Serbia are competing.

Teams

Format

Regular season
In the regular season the teams will be divided into two groups, each containing five teams. Each team plays every other team in its group at home and away. The top 4 teams in each group advance to the playoffs. Games will be played from October 7, 2008 to February 18, 2009.

Quarterfinals
The top four teams in each group advance for the quarterfinals. The winner of Group A/Group B will play with the fourth placed team in Group B/Group A and the second placed team in Group A/Group B will play with the third in Group B/Group A.

Final four
The four remaining teams play a semifinal match and the winners of those advance to the final. The losers play in a third-place playoff.

Regular season

Group A

Group B

Quarterfinals
First legs were on 25 and 26 February and 6 March, second legs were held on March 3, 4 and 10th

Final four

External links
 BIBL official webpage
 Balkan League standings and livescores

2008-09
2008–09 in European basketball leagues
2008–09 in Serbian basketball
2008–09 in Republic of Macedonia basketball
2008–09 in Romanian basketball
2008–09 in Bulgarian basketball